Jonatan Gabriel Tarquini (born 27 June 1994) is an Argentine footballer who plays as a forward.

Career
Tarquini became a senior player for Unión Santa Fe of Primera B Nacional in May 2014. Days after being an unused substitute versus Juventud Unida Universitario in the Copa Argentina, Tarquini made his professional debut in the league during an away draw to Atlético Tucumán. In his first two campaigns with the club, he made eight appearances. In January 2016, Primera B Nacional's Brown signed Tarquini on loan. He was sent off in his second match against Guillermo Brown, receiving a red card two minutes after being substituted on; it turned out to be his last fixture for Brown.

Tarquini was loaned by Sarmiento de Humboldt in late 2017. In the following year, 2018, he joined Sanjustino in Torneo Federal C. In February 2019, it was revealed that Tarquini had joined Unión Santo Domingo of Liga Esperancina. He left at the end of the year.

Career statistics
.

References

External links

1994 births
Living people
Footballers from Santa Fe, Argentina
Argentine footballers
Association football forwards
Primera Nacional players
Argentine Primera División players
Unión de Santa Fe footballers
Club Atlético Brown footballers